The Nightingale is a 2013 Chinese-French drama film directed by Philippe Muyl. It was selected as the Chinese entry for the Best Foreign Language Film at the 87th Academy Awards, but was not nominated.

Cast
 Li Baotian as Zhu Zhi Gen (Grandfather) (as Li Bao Tian)
 Li Xiaoran as Ren Quan Ying (Mother)
 Qin Hao as Zhu Chong Yi (Father)
 Yang Xinyi as Ren Xing

See also
 List of submissions to the 87th Academy Awards for Best Foreign Language Film
 List of Chinese submissions for the Academy Award for Best Foreign Language Film

References

External links
 

2013 films
2013 drama films
Chinese drama films
French drama films
2010s Mandarin-language films
2010s French films